The Post Office Research Station was first established as a separate section of the General Post Office in 1909.

In 1921, the Research Station moved to Dollis Hill, north west London, initially in ex-army huts.

The main permanent buildings at Dollis Hill were opened in 1933 by Prime Minister Ramsay MacDonald.

In 1968 it was announced that the station would be relocated to a new centre to be built at Martlesham Heath in Suffolk. This was formally opened on 21 November 1975 by Queen Elizabeth and is today known as Adastral Park.

The old Dollis Hill site was released for housing, with the main building converted into a block of luxury flats and an access road named Flowers Close, in honour of Tommy Flowers.  Much of the rest of the site contains affordable housing administered by Network Housing.

World War II  

In 1943 the world's first programmable electronic computer, Colossus Mark 1, was built by Tommy Flowers and his team, followed in 1944 and 1945 by nine Colossus Mark 2s. These were used at Bletchley Park in Cryptanalysis of the Lorenz cipher. Dollis Hill also built the predecessor of Colossus  the Heath Robinson (codebreaking machine). The Director, Gordon Radley, was also told of the secret Bletchley Park establishment. 

Members of Flowrers' team included Sydney Broadhurst, William W. Chandler, Harry Fensom; and Allen Coombs (who took over for the Mark II version of Colossus).

Paddock, a World War II concrete two-level underground bunker, was built in secret in 1939 as an alternative Cabinet War Room underneath a corner of the Dollis Hill site. Its surface building was demolished after the war.

Research 

The first transatlantic radio telephone service (in the 1940s).

In 1957 ERNIE (Electronic Random Number Indicator Equipment) was built for the government's Premium Bond lottery, by Sidney Broadhurst's team.

In 1971 Samuel Fedida conceived Viewdata and the Prestel service was launched in 1979.

Notable staff

John Bray
William W. Chandler
Allen Coombs
Dick Dyott
James H. Ellis
Samuel Fedida
Harry Fensom
Tommy Flowers
Gil Hayward
Ralph Archibald Jones. Developed espionage and counter equipment, helped invent the listening devices used for locating buried bomb victims in London and helped devise the standard for telephone systems in Europe.
Arnold Lynch
Frank Morrell
Gordon Radley
Stephanie Shirley
Haakon Sørbye
Eric Speight
Henry John Josephs (H. J. Josephs). Entered the Research Station as a draughtsman but eventually rose to a senior research position being known for his mathematical skills. He was a great admirer of Oliver Heaviside and his work, of which Josephs wrote a monograph on the Heaviside Operational calculus. Josephs was also involved with the IEE (now Institution of Engineering and Technology) in which he presented a number of papers at the Heaviside Centenary Meeting in 1950 and went on to examine, repair and study papers of Oliver Heaviside found under the floorboards of a house in Paignton, Devon, where Oliver Heaviside had once lived.

References

Former buildings and structures in the London Borough of Brent
General Post Office
History of computing
History of telecommunications in the United Kingdom
20th century in London
1921 establishments in the United Kingdom
1921 in London